BR, Br or br may refer to:

In arts and entertainment
 Bad Religion, a Californian punk rock band
 Battle Royale, a video game genre
  (Bavarian Broadcasting), a regional broadcasting service in Germany
 Blade Runner (franchise)
 Blade Runner, a 1982 film by Ridley Scott
 Blade Runner 2049, its 2017 sequel, directed by Denis Villeneuve
 Bleacher Report (B/R), an online sports media network
 Bohemian Rhapsody, which refers to two things:
 the 1975 single, a song from Queen's 1975 album A Night at the Opera,
 or the film of the same name, released in 2018

Businesses and organizations
 Bangladesh Railway, a government owned rail transport authority
 Barry Railway, former railway in Wales
 Baskin Robbins, chain of ice cream shops
 Botswana Railways, the national railway of Botswana
 British Rail, the main state-owned railway operator in Great Britain from 1948 until it was privatised from 1994 to 1997
 EVA Air (IATA code BR), a Taiwanese international airline
 British Caledonian, a defunct British airline whose IATA code was BR
 Red Brigades, an Italian militant leftist group
 Burma Railways, former railway in Myanmar
 Business Recorder, a Pakistani financial newspaper
 Banana Republic, American Clothing store

Mathematics, science, and technology
 Bromine, symbol Br, a chemical element
 Newline element in:
 XHTML (<br />)
 HTML (<br>)
 Polybutadiene, a type of rubber
 Bus request, a control bus signal
 Brotli, a data format specification
 Bluetooth basic rate mode
Bilirubin, a bile pigment that is a degradation product of heme
 BR, the abbreviation assigned to the herbarium of Meise Botanic Garden as the repository of herbarium specimens

Places
 BR postcode area, a group of eight postal districts in southeast London
 Baton Rouge, Louisiana
 Bison Range, Montana
 Brăila, Romania (vehicle plate code BR)
 Brazil (ISO 3166-1 alpha-2 and FIPS 104 code BR)
 , country code top-level domain for Brazil
 Province of Brindisi (ISO 3166-2 subdivision code BR)
 Brown County, Kansas (Kansas state county code BR, used on the state's license plates)

Other uses
 Bambatha Rifles, an infantry regiment of the South African Army
 B&R or B+R, Bike and ride, bicycle parks with public transport connections
 Breton language (ISO 639-1 language code br)
 Brother (Christian), abbreviated form of address
 Br., abbreviated botanical authority for Robert Brown as Br., more commonly R.Br.

See also
 Battle Royale (disambiguation)